Ronald Lee Hornaday Jr. (born June 20, 1958) is an American former professional stock car racing driver. He is the father of former NASCAR driver Ronnie Hornaday and son of the late Ron Hornaday Sr., a two-time Winston West Champion. Hornaday is a four-time champion in the NASCAR Truck Series, his most recent coming in 2009. He was a long-time driver in NASCAR's Winston West Series and is a Featherlite Southwest Tour Champion. He was noticed by Dale Earnhardt while participating in the NASCAR Winter Heat on TNN.

Racing career

Beginnings
Hornaday was born in Palmdale, California, and began racing in go-karts and motorcycles early in his career. Eventually, he moved up to race stock cars at Saugus Speedway. In 1992, he won his first championship in the Southwest Series as well as winning the Most Popular Driver award. He won the Southwest championship the next year as well, becoming the only driver to do so in series history until Jim Pettit won back-to-back titles in 2004–2005. Pettit won the title again in 2011 in the SRL Southwest Tour Series.

He made his Winston Cup debut in 1992 at the Save Mart 300K, where he started 17th but finished 32nd in Bob Fisher's No. 92 Chevrolet. He made another start later that year at Phoenix International Raceway, where he finished 25th. He ran at Phoenix the next year as well, finishing 22nd in the No. 76 Spears Motorsports car.

1995–1999 

Hornaday signed to drive the No. 16 RCCA Products/Papa John's Pizza-sponsored Chevrolet C/K owned by Dale Earnhardt, Inc. for the then-start-up Super Truck Series. In the first season of competition, Hornaday won six races and four poles on his way to a third-place points finish. The next year, with sponsorship from NAPA Auto Parts, Hornaday won four races and the series championship.

In 1997, despite seven wins, two of which came by leading every lap in the race, he finished fifth in points. He was able to reclaim his title in 1998 by garnering six wins and 16 top fives out of 27 races. At Memphis 200 he celebrated with a burnout, which was unusual at the time, and made team owner Dale Earnhardt angry for risking damaging the powertrain.

Also in 1998, Hornaday made his Busch Series debut, driving four races for ST Motorsports, his best finish an eighth at Pikes Peak International Raceway. He also debuted a Winston Cup car for Tim Beverly at Sonoma, finishing fourteenth in the No. 17 NAPA-sponsored Chevy. Hornaday came close to a truck victory at Watkins Glen in the 1998 Parts America 150 in which he led all but 12 laps, only to lose the race due to a final-lap penalty for jumping the restart; Hornaday would pull into victory lane post-race only to be told that he had in fact finished fourth.

In 1999, he won the 100th race ran in NASCAR Craftsman Truck Series history at the Evergreen Speedway in Monroe, Washington. He was one of four drivers entered in the race that competed in every truck race since its inception at the time for an extra $100,000 if he won, which he did. However, he was unable to capitalize on it and win the championship, finishing seventh in the final standings after an up and down year. Fortunately, he was given an opportunity late in the year to replace Dale Earnhardt Jr. in driving the No. 3 NAPA-sponsored Chevy for DEI's Busch program with Earnhardt moving up to the cup series, and he announced that he would do so the following year.

2000–2004 
Hornaday began racing full-time in the Busch Series in 2000. He picked up wins at Nazareth Speedway and Indianapolis Raceway Park and finished fifth in points, runner-up to Kevin Harvick for Rookie of the Year honors. He was also voted Most Popular Driver. However, Earnhardt elected to move Hornaday's team up to the Cup series in 2001 and hire Michael Waltrip to drive the car, and Hornaday was released.

Hornaday signed with A.J. Foyt Racing in the Cup series, driving the No. 14 Conseco-sponsored Pontiac Grand Prix. Despite posting a ninth-place finish at Las Vegas, Hornaday struggled throughout the year and finished 38th in points with just two Top 20 finishes and four DNQ's in the second half of the season. Hornaday later criticized Foyt for dismissing him so late in the season, although Foyt unsuccessfully offered Hornaday a Cup Series return in mid-2002. During the 2001 season, Hornaday returned to the Busch Series on a part-time basis, running the No. 11 for HighLine Performance Group before finishing out the year with The Curb Agajanian Performance Group, posting three Top 10's.

In 2002, he drove for Hendrick Motorsports' truck team at the season-opening Florida Dodge Dealers 250, where he finished 12th. After Hendrick closed the doors to its truck team, Hornaday moved to their Busch program, filling in for an injured Ricky Hendrick in the No. 5 GMAC-sponsored Chevy, his best finish 15th at Darlington Raceway. A few races later, he replaced Lyndon Amick in the No. 26 Dr Pepper-sponsored car for Carroll Racing. He had eight Top 10s and a pole, finishing 18th in points despite only running 30 of the 36 races. He also capped the season off with a win in the truck series at Homestead-Miami Speedway, driving for Xpress Motorsports.

In 2003, Hornaday signed to drive the No. 2 ACDelco-sponsored Chevy for Richard Childress Racing. He won at Nazareth and posted 17 Top 10s, finishing third in points. Hornaday was noted for his consistency in 2003, as he finished all 34 races and completed all but 30 laps run over the entire season. In 2004, he followed up with a win at The Milwaukee Mile and 16 more Top 10 finishes. Hornaday again finished all the races he started and finished fourth in points.

2005–2011 

At the end of 2004, Hornaday was released in favor of Clint Bowyer, and he returned to the Truck Series. He reunited with a long-time best friend of his, Kevin Harvick, and signed to drive the No. 6 GM Goodwrench-sponsored Chevy for Kevin Harvick Incorporated. Hornaday soon picked up a win at Atlanta Motor Speedway and finished fifth in points. In 2006, the team lost its Goodwrench sponsorship and switched to the No. 33 to yield the No. 6 to Mark Martin's Roush Racing effort. Running unsponsored for most of the year, Hornaday picked up two victories this year at Mansfield and Kentucky. He also had two Top 10s in five Busch Series starts that year.

With sponsorship backing from Camping World, he continued his dominance in the Truck Series in 2007, winning races at two tracks for the first time in his career.  He took the checkers at Lowe's in the Quaker Steak & Lube 200.  Two weeks later, after a what-should-have-been-a-win-weekend at Mansfield, Hornaday outlasted Kyle Busch to win the AAA Insurance 200 at Dover.  He continued his chase for a third title with a victory at O'Reilly Raceway Park in the Power Stroke Diesel 200, his 17th win on a short track.

On November 16, 2007, Hornaday won his third NASCAR Craftsman Truck Series Championship by overcoming a 29-point deficit on Mike Skinner.

On September 10, 2008, ESPN's Shaun Assael reported Hornaday admitted to using testosterone cream. He used it to treat Graves' disease. On December 21, 2008, Hornaday's father Ron Hornaday Sr., died due to cancer.

On June 20, 2009, Hornaday won the Copart 200 at the Milwaukee Mile on his 51st birthday. He is one of the few racing drivers to win a race on his birthday. On July 24, 2009, Hornaday became the first Camping World Truck Series driver to win four races in a row by winning at O'Reilly Raceway Park. On August 1, 2009, he won the Toyota Tundra 200 at Nashville Superspeedway, tying Richard Petty and Bobby Allison as the only drivers to win five consecutive races in their NASCAR careers.

On November 13, 2009, he won his fourth Camping World Truck Series championship, joining Jeff Gordon, Richard Petty, Dale Earnhardt, and Jimmie Johnson as the only drivers to win 4 or more titles in the three major series of NASCAR. He also became the first driver since Greg Biffle in 2000 to clinch the title before the last race of the season.

For the final three races of the 2010 Sprint Cup season, Stewart-Haas Racing hired Hornaday as a standby driver should expectant father Ryan Newman have to leave the track. Newman became a father on November 18, 2010, three days before the season finale.

In 2011, Hornaday won four races. However, in the later stages of the season, he struggled with consistency, compared to his other seasons. As a result, Hornaday drove three races in the #2 KHI truck, to help the team catch up in the standings. By the time he was back in the #33 truck, Hornaday was second in the series being 15 points behind Austin Dillon when he reached the penultimate race of the year at Texas. There Hornaday raced behind rival Kyle Busch and reached second place. When Hornaday passed by Busch on lap 13, he made contact with Busch to avoid a slowing truck of Johnny Chapman and in the next turn under a caution, Busch intentionally slammed into Hornaday pushing him head-on into the wall. Hornaday was mathematically eliminated from contention for the Truck title. Busch received suspension from the NNS and NSCS race that weekend as a result. Hornaday later said that after hearing Busch's arrogance after the incident, he was going to settle matters with Busch at the end of the race, but was restrained and instead had a phone call with Busch a couple days after that sizzled the feud.

2012–2014

During the 2011 season, it was announced that Hornaday would drive for Joe Denette Motorsports for the 2012 season in the No. 9 Anderson's Maple Syrup Chevrolet.

Before the 2013 season, Hornaday returned to JDM, now NTS Motorsports, to drive the No. 9 truck. Hornaday started off on a high note in his finishes with a few top tens in the first few races. In the third race of the season at Rockingham Speedway, Hornaday intentionally wrecked rookie Darrell Wallace Jr. under caution to retaliate for prior contact. He was penalized during the race to restart in 37th spot. For his actions, Hornaday was fined $25,000, lost 25 points and was placed on probation by NASCAR until June 12. The penalty dropped him from 4th to 15th in the Truck Series standings. Although many called for Hornaday to be suspended the same way Kyle Busch was in 2011, NASCAR did not implement a suspension, ruling that although Hornaday's actions were similar, the circumstances between both cases were different.

With one race remaining in the season, Hornaday was released from the No. 9 truck by NTS Motorsports; in the season finale he drove a sixth truck for Turner Scott Motorsports, finishing fifth. He started the 2014 season once again driving for TSM in the No. 30 truck at Daytona International Speedway, with former KHI sponsor Rheem backing the team. Due to an internal dispute within TSM, Hornaday did not race at Canadian Tire Motorsport Park, after it was initially reported that all three truck teams would shut down.

Two days later on September 2, Hornaday was released and Turner Scott Motorsports dissolved the 30 team, with owners Steve Turner and Harry Scott Jr. in the process of filing lawsuits against each other. Hornaday was 4th in points prior to the Canada race, and still 6th in points when he was released. On September 13, it was announced that Rheem would partner again with Hornaday at Las Vegas and Texas later that year with NTS Motorsports, the team that had released him in 2013. He missed 6 races late in the season and was 14th in points at the season's end.

Brief Cup Series return
On January 21, 2015, Curtis Key's The Motorsports Group announced that Hornaday would be their primary driver for 2015, running the No. 30 Chevy in the Sprint Cup Series. It marked Hornaday's first return to the Cup Series since 2003. The primary sponsor was announced as Hornaday's Truck sponsor, Smokey Mountain Herbal Snuff.

In his first attempt, Hornaday failed to qualify for the Daytona 500 after posting the slowest time in qualifying and then lacking the necessary speed to stay in the draft in his Budweiser Duel race. In his second attempt, Hornaday qualified and made his first race in 12 years. Hornaday finished 42nd due to his rear gear breaking. His team skipped the next three races in the West Coast swing to prepare for Martinsville. He did not qualify after wrecking his car during qualifying. After Hornaday once again failed to qualify at Bristol, he and the team parted ways.

On his brief return to Sprint Cup competition and his sudden retirement, Hornaday said in a 2016 interview, "That was helping a team get started and all that stuff. It didn’t seem to work out. I was always the guy, I told my wife that I’m not going to go out there and ride around just for a paycheck. If I wasn’t competitive I wasn’t going to do it. That (opportunity) didn’t work out. But I’ve got a lot of opportunities. People call me and say, ‘Hey, do you want to drive Martinsville?’ I said ‘Yeah, I’d love to.’ And they’d say, ‘Well, how much money can you bring?’ That ain’t racing to me anymore so…it’s back to dirt racing and having fun.”

Hornaday has not raced in NASCAR since. He is currently a dirt modified chassis builder, owning Hornaday Race Cars.

Recognition
April 8, 2010 was declared Ron Hornaday Jr. Day in Palmdale, Hornaday's hometown. A roundabout in the Palmdale Auto Mall was also named after Hornaday on April 8. On May 24, 2017, Hornaday was named in the NASCAR Hall of Fame Class of 2018, becoming the first Truck Series driver to earn this honor.

Personal life
Before his racing career took off, Hornaday worked at a couple transmission shops and his father's car dealership. He got married at age 20. During his time racing for Kevin Harvick Inc. in the Truck Series, Hornaday lost a significant amount of weight in a short period of time, and was taken by Kevin Harvick to a local doctor where he was diagnosed with Graves' disease.

Images

Motorsports career results

NASCAR

Sprint Cup Series
(key) (Bold – Pole position awarded by qualifying time. Italics – Pole position earned by points standings or practice time. * – Most laps led

Daytona 500

Xfinity Series

Camping World Truck Series

Winston West Series

ARCA Menards Series
(key) (Bold – Pole position awarded by qualifying time. Italics – Pole position earned by points standings or practice time. * – Most laps led.)

 Season still in progress
 Ineligible for series points

References

External links

 
 
 

Living people
1958 births
American Speed Association drivers
People from Palmdale, California
Sportspeople from Los Angeles County, California
Racing drivers from California
NASCAR drivers
NASCAR Truck Series champions
ARCA Menards Series drivers
Dale Earnhardt Inc. drivers
Richard Childress Racing drivers
NASCAR Hall of Fame inductees
A. J. Foyt Enterprises drivers
Hendrick Motorsports drivers